Transformer (tra) is a family of genes which regulate sex determination in insects such as flies. Among its effects, it regulates differences between males and females in Drosophila fruit flies.

The tra-2 gene is needed for sexual differentiation in female fruit flies, and for spermatogenesis in the males. It is not in the same protein family as tra, but instead works together with it in the splicing enhancer complex.

References

Eukaryote genes
Sex-determination systems